Clara S, musikalische Tragödie is a play by Austrian playwright Elfriede Jelinek. It was first published in 1982. The play depicts a fictional meeting in 1929 between nineteenth-century German composer Clara Schumann and Gabrielle D'Annunzio, a late nineteenth/early twentieth century Italian author.

References

Plays by Elfriede Jelinek
1982 plays